For a Minor Reflection is a post-rock band from Reykjavík, Iceland. Their self-produced debut album Reistu þig við, sólin er komin á loft... (which translates as "Rise and shine, the sun is up") featuring six songs lasting an hour in total, all recorded over a weekend in Iceland. The record, as well as their energetic live shows, earned them a slew of accolades, including favourable comparisons to Explosions in the Sky. Their fellow Icelanders Sigur Rós even described them as “a band with the potential to out Mogwai” and invited them on a 15 dates European tour with them in November 2008.

History
Starting life as a hard rock duo in a tiny garage in Reykjavík, Iceland, For a Minor Reflection morphed into an indie rock trio (for a week or so) and a blues quartet (for a little longer) before finally arriving at their current incarnation as instrumental post-rockers.

Discography

 Reistu þig við, sólin er komin á loft... (2007)
 Höldum í átt að óreiðu (2010)
 For a Minor Reflection E.P. (2011)
 Live at Iceland Airwaves (2013)

References

External links
 

For A Minor Reflection
Musical groups from Reykjavík